Thiruvambady State assembly constituency is one of the 140 state legislative assembly constituencies in Kerala state in southern India.  It is also one of the 7 state legislative assembly constituencies included in the Wayanad Lok Sabha constituency. As of the 2021 assembly elections, the current MLA is Linto Joseph of CPI(M).

Local self governed segments
Thiruvambady Niyamasabha constituency is composed of the following local self governed segments:

Members of Legislative Assembly 
The following list contains all members of Kerala legislative assembly who have represented the constituency:

Key

     

* indicates bypolls

Election results 
Percentage change (±%) denotes the change in the number of votes from the immediate previous election.

Niyamasabha Election 2021

There were 1,80,289 registered voters in the constituency for the 2021 election.

Niyamasabha Election 2016 
There were 1,68,412 registered voters in the constituency for the 2016 election.

Niyamasabha Election 2011 
There were 1,45,763 registered voters in the constituency for the 2011 election.

See also 
 Thiruvambady
 Kozhikode district
 List of constituencies of the Kerala Legislative Assembly
 2016 Kerala Legislative Assembly election

References 

Assembly constituencies of Kerala

State assembly constituencies in Kozhikode district